Alpenus diversatus is a moth of the subfamily Arctiinae. It was described by George Hampson in 1916. It is found in Somalia.

References

Endemic fauna of Somalia
Moths described in 1916
Spilosomina
Moths of Africa
Insects of Somalia